Wilhelm Friedrich Loeper (13 October 1883 – 23 October 1935) was a German Nazi politician. He served as the Gauleiter in the Gau of Magdeburg-Anhalt and was the Reichsstatthalter of the Free States of Anhalt and Brunswick

Military career

First, Loeper became an Officer Candidate (Fahnenjunker) in Pioneer Battalion 2 in Spandau and then completed training at the Neiße Military School. Already in 1904 he was made a leutnant, and after various other commands, eventually an oberleutnant in 1912. Then came his transfer to the Magdeburg Pioneer Battalion 4, where he took over command of a searchlight platoon.

After the First World War broke out, Loeper was then deployed between 1914 and 1918 at the Western Front as a hauptmann and company chief of Pioneer Battalion 19. He was wounded several times. For the service in the World War I, he was decorated with both classes of the Iron Cross, both classes of the Mecklenburg-Schwerin Military Merit Cross, Frederickscross, Prussian Service Cross and Wound Badge in Black.

After the war ended, Loeper became leader of a Freikorps that saw deployment both in the Baltic States and the Ruhr area. In this capacity, he was involved in quelling the Spartakus uprising.

With the founding of the Reichswehr, Loeper became company chief of Pioneer Battalion 2. In 1923, he worked as an Instructor at the Pionierschule in Munich, and got to know Adolf Hitler. Loeper took part in the Beer Hall Putsch of 9 November 1923 and aimed at getting the Pionierschule to fall in and follow Hitler's orders. After the putsch failed, Loeper was discharged from the Reichswehr in 1924 for his participation.

Nazi career

Loeper joined the NSDAP (Nazi Party) in 1925. He moved to Dessau in Gau Anhalt and became the Ortsgruppenleiter (Local Group Leader) there. In the same year he became the Gau's Deputy Business Manager. In September 1926 he advanced to Organization Leader, Propaganda Leader and Deputy Gauleiter. Finally, on 1 April 1927, he became Gauleiter of the now enlarged Gau Anhalt-Provinz Sachsen-Nord, succeeding Gustav Hermann Schmischke. The Gau was renamed Gau Magdeburg-Anhalt on 1 October 1928. Loeper gave himself over to building the Party up in his Gau, and fought against the Bauhaus, which was located in Dessau at that time. In a letter in 1930 he wrote "as the Bauhaus belongs to Jerusalem and not to Dessau". Loeper later had a decisive part in stripping this institution of its assets.

In 1928, Loeper became a member of the Anhalt Landtag. In January 1930, Loeper became leader of the Nazi Party's personnel office at the party headquarters in the Brown House in Munich. In September 1930, Loeper was also elected a member of the Reichstag for electoral district 10, (Magdeburg).  Anhalt had a Nazi Land government as early as May 1932 headed by Alfred Freyburg, and in that year Loeper published the first issue of the Nazi newspaper Trommler and established the publishing house Trommler-Verlag. In 1932 he instituted at Schloß Großkühnau (in Dessau) the first Stammabteilung and the Führerschule of the Reichsarbeitsdienst. On 15 July 1932 came Loeper's appointment as Landesinspekteur for Middle Germany-Brandenburg. In this position, he had oversight responsibility for his Gau and three others (Brandenburg, Halle-Merseburg & Ostmark). This was a short-lived initiative by Gregor Strasser to centralize control over the Gaue. However, it was unpopular with the Gauleiters and was repealed on Strasser's resignation in December 1932. Loeper then returned to his Gauleiter position in Magdeburg-Anhalt.

After the Nazis' nationwide seizure of power in 1933, Loeper was appointed Reichsstatthalter (Reich Governor) for the Free States of Brunswick and Anhalt. He set up office in Dessau. In May he also was named an honorary Gau leader of the Reichsarbeitsdienst. Also in 1933, the city of Magdeburg made him an honorary citizen, a distinction of which he was posthumously stripped in 1946.  On 9 February 1934, he was officially enrolled in the SS and appointed an honorary SS-Gruppenführer. In September 1935, he became a member of the Academy for German Law (Akademie für Deutsches Recht).

On 23 October 1935, Loeper died of neck cancer. At the funeral, Hitler himself delivered the eulogy. His burial took place in the Napoleon Tower (Napoleonturm) in Mildensee near Dessau. Various honours flowed from the region. The Magdeburg borough of Ottersleben named a street Hauptmann-Loeper-Straße after him. After the Nazi régime fell, though, such honours quickly disappeared.

References

Bibliography 
Gerald Christopeit, Magdeburger Biographisches Lexikon, 2002, Magdeburg, .

External links
 

1883 births
1935 deaths
Deaths from cancer in Germany
Gauleiters
German Army personnel of World War I
Members of the Academy for German Law
Members of the Reichstag of the Weimar Republic
Members of the Reichstag of Nazi Germany
Nazi Party officials
Nazi Party politicians
Nazis who participated in the Beer Hall Putsch
People from Schwerin
People from the Grand Duchy of Mecklenburg-Schwerin
SS-Gruppenführer
20th-century Freikorps personnel